is a Japanese idol, singer, tarento and a former member of the Japanese girl idol group AKB48. She is in Team A of AKB48. She became the first  of AKB48 and its sister groups. In an interview with Nippon Television in June 2010, AKB48 producer Yasushi Akimoto says she is the "eldest daughter of the 48 sisters". She is also regarded as "soul of AKB", and her motto "Making efforts will be paid" has inspired many members of AKB48. She is commonly part of the main lineup of AKB48 singles. She was a member of the AKB48 sub-group no3b, alongside fellow AKB48 graduates Minami Minegishi and Haruna Kojima. She has a business alliance with Mama&Son Inc.

Career
Takahashi was born in Hachiōji, Tokyo. In August 2005, she became one of the 30th HoriPro Talent Contest's 15 final candidates, but she did not win the competition's Grand-Prix prize. In October 2005, she participated in the first AKB48 audition and beat 7,924 other applicants to be chosen as one of the 24 founding members of the group. According to Tomonobu Togasaki, the manager of the AKB48 Theater, she had two unofficial advantages going for her, in that both her birthday (8 April; 1991-04-08) and her height (148 cm) contain the number "48". She debuted with Team A on 8 December 2005.

In 2008, no3b members, including Takahashi, appeared in the TV Tokyo drama Men Dol. She starred as Nami/Kai in this television series.

On 23 August 2009, Takahashi was officially announced as the captain of AKB48's Team A.

Three years later, on 24 August 2012, with Mariko Shinoda replacing her as the captain of Team A, Minami Takahashi was promoted to be the General Director of the entire AKB48 enterprise, including all sister groups.

Takahashi appears regularly in the AKB48 singles as one of the group's key singers. In addition, Minami frequently represents AKB48 on TV programs such as Music Station, and in other of the group's publicity events. She was also scheduled to take part in the AKB48's 3-day live concert event titled , which was to have been held on 25–27 March 2011 at the Yokohama Arena but was cancelled due to the 2011 Tōhoku earthquake and tsunami.

On 25 August 2012, the second day of AKB48 Tokyo Dome Concert, it was announced by Max Hole that Takahashi would make her solo debut with the company, through its Nayutawave Records label. The single, titled "Jane Doe", was released on 3 April 2013. It is the opening theme song for the Fuji Television TV drama Saki, which stars Yukie Nakama.

On 8 December 2014, the 9th Anniversary of AKB48 Theater, it was confirmed by Takahashi herself that she would officially leave AKB48 exactly one year later, or 8 December 2015, the 10th Anniversary of the AKB48 Theater. Yui Yokoyama will then succeed her job as the General Director of AKB48.

On 25 October 2015, during the handshake and autograph event at Pacific Yokohama had announced the details of AKB48's 42nd Single and Request Hour 2016. The 42nd Single will be released on 9 December 2015. She will be the Center which will be her final appearance on an AKB48 single.

On 26 to 27 March 2016, her graduation concert titled "Congratulation Takahashi Minami Graduation "148.5 cm Have Seen a Dream" in Yokohama Stadium" was held at Yokohama Stadium, with her last theater performance on 8 April 2016.

On 8 April 2017, Takahshi held her own birthday party titled "Minami Takahashi 26th Birthday Live 2017❤︎199104080127❤︎26❤︎" with the members of no3b reunited.

Since her graduation, Takahashi has been hosting her own radio show "Takahashi Minami no [Korekara Nanisuru?]" (Takahashi Minami's "What are you going to do now?") on Tokyo FM airing every Monday-Thursday at 1:00 p.m. to 2:55 pm, as well as having a solo singer career.

Personal life 
On 1 May 2019, Takahashi announced her marriage to a non-celebrity man 15 years her senior.

AKB48 general elections 
 Ranked 5th in the 2009 general election
 Ranked 6th in the 2010 general election
 Ranked 7th in the 2011 general election
 Ranked 6th in the 2012 general election
 Ranked 8th in the 2013 general election
 Ranked 9th in the 2014 general election
 Ranked 4th in the 2015 general election

Discography

Solo singles

Solo albums

Singles with AKB48

Albums with AKB48
 Set List: Greatest Songs 2006–2007
 Kamikyokutachi
 Set List: Greatest Songs Kanzenban
 Koko ni Ita Koto
 1830m
 Tsugi no Ashiato
 Koko ga Rhodes da, Koko de Tobe!
 0 to 1 no Aida

no3b

Stage units 

Team A 1st Stage: Party ga Hajimaru yo
 4. Skirt, Hirari
 8. Hoshi no Ondo 
Team A 2nd Stage: Aitakatta
 1. Nageki no Figure
 5. Glass no I Love You
 7. Senaka Kara Dakishimete
 8. Rio no Kakumei
Team A 3rd Stage: Dareka no Tame ni
 4. Bird
 8. Seifuku ga Jama o Suru
Team A 4th Stage: Tadaima Renaichuu
 6. Junai no Crescendo

Team A 5th Stage: Renai Kinshi Jōrei
 7. Renai Kinshi Jourei (Takahashi Team A 1 version)
 8. Tsundere! (Takahashi Team A 2 version)
Team A 6th Stage: Mokugekisha
 7. Itoshisa no Accel
Team A Waiting Stage
 9. Ame no Pianist (original unit)
 4. Kioku no Dilemma (new unit) 
Himawari-gumi 1st Stage: Boku no Taiyō
 7. Higurashi no Koi
Himawari-gumi 2nd Stage: Yume o Shinaseru Wake ni Ikanai
 5. Bye Bye Bye

Team Surprise 1st Stage:
 6. 1994-nen no Raimei
 8. Oteage Lullaby
 14. Dessan
Team Surprise 2nd Stage:
 3. Yume wo miru nara
 7. Hell or Heaven

Filmography

Movies

Dramas

Video games

Musicals

Solo Concerts

Solo Events

Radio

Television programs

Other media

Essays 
  (22 December 2015, Kobunsha)

Photobooks 
 B.L.T. U-17 summer (7 August 2008, Tokyo News Tsushinsha)
  (22 September 2010, Kodansha)
  (24 February 2016, Kobunsha)

Calendar 
  (1 November 2016, PHP)

References

External links 

 

  at Ogipro 
 Minami Takahashi profile at Universal Music / EMI Records 

1991 births
Living people
Actresses from Tokyo
Japanese female idols
Japanese film actresses
Japanese television actresses
Japanese women pop singers
AKB48 members
Musicians from Hachiōji, Tokyo
Universal Music Japan artists
21st-century Japanese actresses
21st-century Japanese women singers
21st-century Japanese singers